The Erstwhile is a dark historical fantasy novel by multi-disciplinary artist B. Catling that was first published in March of 2017. It is the second in a trilogy of novels focusing on 'the Vorrh,' a massive and magical African forest.

Critical reception
The Erstwhile received generally positive critical reception, garnering coverage from a wide variety of publications.

By contrast, the review at Kirkus calls the book "slow and murky" and criticizes its relentless focus on imagery over plot, characterization, or theme.

Editions

References

Dark fantasy novels
Historical fantasy novels
2017 fantasy novels
2017 British novels
British fantasy novels
Vintage Books books